Osama Abu Irshaid is a board member and national director for American Muslims for Palestine (AMP). He also serves on the board of United States Council of Muslim organizations. He completed his masters at Northeastern Illinois University and received his doctorate at Loughborough University. 

He has frequently appeared on media outlets such as National Public Radio, Al Jazeera, Syrian TV, Al-Alam, and Al Hiwar TV as a commentator on Palestinian and Middle Eastern affairs and United States domestic and foreign policy.

References

Living people
Year of birth missing (living people)